Barrio Bellavista (Bellavista Neighborhood) is an area that lies between the Mapocho River and San Cristóbal Hill in Santiago, Chile. It is known as Santiago's bohemian quarter, with numerous restaurants, boutiques, avant-garde galleries, bars and clubs. Many of the city's intellectuals and artists live in Bellavista, and Pablo Neruda's house in Santiago, La Chascona, is in the district. The area is served by the Baquedano Metro subway station, located across the river to the south.

Bellavista is a popular place to purchase craftwork made from lapis lazuli, a semiprecious stone found principally in Chile and Afghanistan. On weekends, there is an evening handicrafts market that runs the length of Pío Nono. Another attraction is the Santa Filomena Parish also known as the Parroquia de Santa Filomena. The National Zoo of Chile is located at the entrance of San Cristóbal Hill.

References

External links

 Barrio Bellavista in Santiago, Chile – City Guide

Geography of Santiago, Chile
Entertainment districts in Chile
Restaurant districts and streets
Neighborhoods in Santiago, Chile